Berchmans College is a private Catholic primary and secondary school, located in Cali, Colombia. The co-educational, pre-K–12 school was founded by the Society of Jesus in 1933.

See also

 Catholic Church in Colombia
 Education in Colombia
 List of Jesuit schools

References  

Jesuit secondary schools in Colombia
Jesuit primary schools in Colombia
Educational institutions established in 1933
1933 establishments in Colombia
Schools in Cali